Nick Tompkins (born 16 February 1995) is a rugby union player who plays at centre for English Premiership club Saracens and the Wales national team.

Tompkins came through the academy at Saracens. Born in Sidcup, England, Tompkins qualifies for Wales through his Welsh grandmother.

Club career
Tompkins started playing rugby at an early age for Old Elthamians RFC. After initially playing as a flanker, he made the switch to centre while in the Saracens academy. In 2012, Tompkins made his debut for Saracens in the LV Cup. His 100th Saracens cap came in 2019, when he scored a hat-trick in 28 minutes against Gloucester in the Premiership Rugby semi-final. He was a replacement as Saracens won the 2018–19 Premiership final against Exeter Chiefs. He was also a replacement as Saracens won the 2019 European Rugby Champions Cup Final.

On 26 June 2020, Tompkins joined the Dragons on loan from Saracens for the 2020–21 season.

International
Tompkins played for England at age group level and England Saxons.

In January 2020, Tompkins was selected for the senior Wales 2020 Six Nations squad. He qualifies for Wales through his Wrexham-born grandmother. On 1 February 2020, Tompkins made his international debut for Wales as a first-half injury replacement and scored a try in the 42–0 win over Italy.

International tries

References

External links
 
Saracens F.C. Profile
RBS U20 Six Nations Profile
England Rugby Profile

1995 births
Living people
English rugby union players
Rugby union players from Sidcup
Saracens F.C. players
Wales international rugby union players
Welsh rugby union players
Rugby union centres